Sampson Eardley, 1st Baron Eardley FRS (10 October 1744 – 25 December 1824), known as Sir Sampson Gideon from 1759 until 1789, was the son of Sampson Gideon (1699–1762), a Jewish banker in the City of London who advised the British government in the 1740s and 1750s, and his wife Jane (died 1778), daughter of Charles Ermell of London.

Biography
The younger Sampson Gideon (as he then was) was educated at Tonbridge School and Eton College.  He was created a baronet, on 21 May 1759, under his father's influence though aged only 14 years. His father had lobbied for the same honour for himself from the prime minister, the Duke of Newcastle, but was denied it on account of his own religion, as he remained a practising Jew. The younger Sampson Gideon and his two sisters, on the contrary, whose mother was Christian, were baptised and brought up in the Church of England.

He served as Tory Member of Parliament for Cambridgeshire from 1770 to 1780, Midhurst from 1780 to 1784, Coventry from 1784 to 1796, and Wallingford from 1796 to 1802. He was elected as a Bailiff to the board of the Bedford Level Corporation in 1767, a position he held until his death.

On 17 July 1789 he legally changed his surname to that of Eardley. and in the same year he was created an Irish peer, with the title of Baron Eardley, of Spalding in the County of Lincoln. An Irish peerage carried no seat in the British House of Lords and thus did not disqualify him from membership of the British House of Commons. In November 1789 he was elected a Fellow of the Royal Society (FRS) and he was also Fellow of the Society of Antiquaries (FSA).

Lord Eardley was the first Provincial Grand Master of Cambridgeshire Freemasons, appointed in 1796, until his death.

His two sons predeceased him, and the peerage became extinct on Lord Eardley's death, at 10 Marina Parade, Brighton, on Christmas Day, 1824, aged 80. He was buried at Erith, Kent. His daughter the Honourable Charlotte Elizabeth married Sir Culling Smith, 2nd Baronet, and their son Sir Culling Smith assumed the surname of Eardley in lieu of Smith in 1847 (see Eardley baronets). Charlotte's and Sir Culling Smith's daughter Maria Charlotte married Reverend Eardley Childers Walbanke-Childers and was the mother of politician Hugh Childers.

Personal life
In 1766, he married Maria Wilmot, the daughter of Sir John Eardley Wilmot, Chief Justice of the Common Pleas  from 1766 to 1771 and his wife Sarah Rivett, with whom he had five children;

 Maria Marowe Eardley (22 November 1767 – 5 September 1834), married Gregory William Eardley-Twisleton-Fiennes, 14th Baron Saye and Sele, had issue
 Charlotte Elizabeth Gideon (1768 – 15 September 1820), married Sir Culling Smith, 2nd Baronet, had issue
 Sampson Eardley (20 December 1770 – June 1824), died unmarried
 Selena Gideon (born 1772), married Colonel John Walbanke-Childers, had issue
 William Eardley (1774–1805), died unmarried

Notes

References 

1744 births
1824 deaths
People educated at Tonbridge School
People educated at Eton College
Barons in the Peerage of Ireland
Peers of Ireland created by George III
English people of Portuguese-Jewish descent
Fellows of the Royal Society
Fellows of the Society of Antiquaries of London
Freemasons of the Premier Grand Lodge of England
Members of the Parliament of Great Britain for English constituencies
British MPs 1768–1774
British MPs 1774–1780
British MPs 1780–1784
British MPs 1784–1790
British MPs 1790–1796
British MPs 1796–1800
Members of the Parliament of the United Kingdom for English constituencies
UK MPs 1801–1802
Jewish British politicians
Tory MPs (pre-1834)
Culling Smith Eardley family
Members of Parliament for Coventry